The 2012 American Le Mans Series presented by Tequila Patrón VIR 240 was a multi-class sports car and GT motor race held at Virginia International Raceway in Alton, Virginia, United States on September 15, 2012. It was the ninth and penultimate round of the 2012 American Le Mans Series season. It was a new event for the American Le Mans Series but had been held the previous ten years for the Rolex Sports Car Series. The race was held over a four-hour time period, during which 135 laps of the 3.3 kilometre "Full Course" circuit were completed for a race distance of 710 kilometres.

The race was won by Muscle Milk Pickett Racing pair of Lucas Luhr and Klaus Graf in their HPD ARX-03a. The leaders of the P1 championship won by three laps over their season long rivals from the Dyson Racing Team, Chris Dyson and Guy Smith in their Lola B12/60. One lap further behind in third place was the P2 class winners, Level 5 Motorsports team of Scott Tucker and Christophe Bouchut in their HPD ARX-03b. They won the P2 class by 27 seconds over their season-long rivals the Conquest Endurance team of Martin Plowman and David Heinemeier Hansson in their Morgan LMP2.

Three of the five class championships of drivers were decided, the first of them was the Prototype Challenge. Jon Bennett and Colin Braun did all they could to keep the championship alive, winning PC in their CORE Autosport Oreca FLM09, but third place was enough for their Venezuelan team mate Alex Popow to wrap up his first ALMS class championship, despite being involved in a first lap collision.

In eighth place was the GT class and championship winners the Corvette Racing pair of Oliver Gavin and Tommy Milner in their Chevrolet Corvette C6.R. In wrapping up the champion Gavin won his class for Corvette Racing for the fourth time with Milner claiming his first ALMS title. It also returned Corvette Racing to the winners list for the first time since 2008 after dominating much of the decade.

Similarly Cooper MacNeil won the GT Challenge class from the front, wrapping his championship up for Alex Job Racing with a 0.4 second win with his co-driver Leh Keen over the NGT Motorsport pair of Henrique Cisneros and Jeroen Bleekemolen.

28 of the 31 entries were running at races conclusion, although the second of the Level 5 Motorsports HPD ARX-03b's was subsequently excluded for failing an air-restrictor stall test after the race.

Race

Race result
Class winners in bold.  Cars failing to complete 70% of their class winner's distance are marked as Not Classified (NC).

References

Virginia
VIR 240
VIR 240